Tutting may refer to:

A dental click interjection  "tut-tut"
Tutting, a locality in Kirchham, Germany
Tutting (dance), a movement style in popping street dance
Finger tutting, a related hand movement to tutting in body-popping dance